The 1975 World Judo Championships were the 9th edition of the Men's World Judo Championships, and were held in Vienna, Austria from 23–25 October, 1975.

Medal overview

Men

Medal table

External links
results on judoinside.com retrieved December 10, 2013
videos found by de.video.search.yahoo.com retrieved December 10, 2013

World Championships
J
World Judo Championships
J